Mesoclanis polana is a species of tephritid or fruit flies in the genus Mesoclanis of the family Tephritidae.

Distribution
Mozambique, South Africa.

References

Tephritinae
Insects described in 1931
Diptera of Africa